Keith and Kevin Schultz (born September 16, 1953) are American identical twin photographers and former actors.  Reportedly making their screen debut as infants, the Schultz brothers are perhaps best known for their roles as brothers Jefferson and Fennimore on the ABC western frontier series The Monroes, as well as for Kevin's role as Tom Sawyer on the NBC live-action/animated series The New Adventures of Huckleberry Finn.  After careers as child actors in front of the camera, the Schultz brothers transitioned to a career working together as professional photographers, best known for their celebrity "head shots" of notable Hollywood child stars.

Early life
The Schultz brothers were born Keith Sean Schultz and Kevin Edward Schultz on September 16, 1953 in Santa Monica, California to Earl and Evelyn Schultz.  The brothers grew up in Hollywood with an older sister, Barbara (born c. 1948) and an older brother, Richard (born c. 1951).  According to IMDb, the brothers made their screen debut as infants in the feature film The Long Gray Line, sharing an uncredited role as the infant son of Kitty, played by Betsy Palmer.  At age 8, they appeared on the Jan. 15, 1962 episode of the quiz show I've Got a Secret, their secret being that they had worked with panelist Palmer as infants. Throughout their childhood, the brothers continued to work as professional child actors, primarily playing twin roles in various commercials, films and television series.

Career

Acting

In 1966, Keith and Kevin landed starring roles on the television series The Monroes, portraying twin brothers Jefferson "Big Twin" Monroe and Fennimore "Little Twin" Monroe respectively.  The series, which also starred Michael Anderson, Jr., Barbara Hershey and Tammy Locke, centered around a frontier family of five orphan siblings as they attempted to make a new life in Jackson Hole, Wyoming.  Although only lasting one season, the series launched the Schultz brothers as popular child stars of the day and the twins were routinely in demand to make celebrity appearances to meet with young fans across the United States during the height of the show's popularity.

After The Monroes, the Schultz brothers auditioned for the Hanna-Barbera television series The New Adventures of Huckleberry Finn, loosely based on the characters from the Mark Twain novel.  Eventually beating out his brother for the role, Kevin co-starred as Tom Sawyer alongside Michael Shea as Huck Finn and LuAnn Haslam as Becky Thatcher, navigating weekly adventures within an animated world as they attempted to outrun a vengeful "Injun Joe", played by Ted Cassidy.  All less than a year apart in age, the show's three teenage stars were tutored together for three hours a day on the set between scenes, with each episode reportedly taking approximately four hours to film and six months to animate.

Premiering on NBC on September 16, 1968, The New Adventures of Huckleberry Finn aired in over 15 countries and was the first weekly television series to combine live-action performers with animation.  In a departure from the network's usual Saturday morning cartoon schedule, the series aired Sunday nights and made its three young stars popular teen idols of the era.  Although another series that lasted only one season, the show continued to air in reruns as part of The Banana Splits syndication package, becoming well known to subsequent generations for the next four decades.

In addition to The Monroes and The New Adventures of Huckleberry Finn, the Schultz brothers continued to appear in various other film and television roles, with Keith guest-starring on such television series as Gunsmoke, The Flying Nun and Cannon, and Kevin guest-starring on such television series as The Iron Horse, Lucas Tanner, and Eight is Enough, as well as appearing in the feature film Big Wednesday.  Keith and Kevin's final appearance would be together as brothers Ken and K.C. Zeigler on the Showtime comedy series Brothers in the episode titled "Two-Timin' Man" which aired August 6, 1986.

Music
In 1967, following the notoriety they'd achieved on The Monroes, the Schultz brothers embarked on a music career, forming their own four-piece musical group "The Monroe Doctrine" with Greg Reinhardt and their elder brother Ric Schultz.  Keith played rhythm guitar and Kevin played bass while both sang harmony to Ric's lead vocals.  By 1970, the group was known as "Keith, Kevin & Air" and featured the twins performing songs written by their brother Ric, as well as other group members, Brad Driver, Keith Fogel, Tim Henderson and Jim Purvis.  In 1970, Keith, Kevin & Air signed a record deal with Pzazz Records and released a 7" single which included the songs "Euphoria" and "Michael's Theme".

Photography
Following their show business careers in front of the camera, the Schultz brothers transitioned to a joint career behind the camera as celebrity photographers.  According to their website SchultzBrosPhoto.com, the brothers had developed a passion for photography while working as child actors in Hollywood.  Keith is the photographer of the team while Kevin handles the lighting, retouching and restoration elements.  After 30 years of experience, the brothers are perhaps best known for their celebrity "head shots" of such child stars as Jonathan Taylor Thomas, Raven-Symoné and Mary-Kate and Ashley Olsen, among others.

Personal life
As teenagers, the Schultz twins garnered a significant amount of attention from the teen magazines of the late-1960s and were said to have shared many of the same interests and ambitions.  At the time, the brothers' interests reportedly included swimming, fishing, baseball and football, as well as watching their favorite television show, The Avengers and listening to records by their favorite singing group, The Byrds.

Filmography

References

External links
 
 
 
 
 Schultz Bros. Photography at SchultzBrosPhoto.com

1953 births
20th-century American male actors
Male actors from Los Angeles
American child singers
American male child actors
American male film actors
American photographers
American male television actors
Living people
Male actors from Santa Monica, California
American twins
Sibling musical duos
Identical twin male actors
Musical groups established in 1967